Polar Vortex is a 2020 novel by Canadian author Shani Mootoo.

This domestic drama deals with the complexities of modern love. A love triangle develops between Priya, Alexandra and Prakash.

The novel was shortlisted for the Giller Prize in 2020.

References

2020 Canadian novels
2020s LGBT novels
Novels by Shani Mootoo
Akashic Books books